The Multimoog is a monophonic analog synthesizer manufactured by Moog Music from 1978 to 1981. Derived from the earlier Micromoog (internally, it consists of a stock Micromoog circuit board with the extra circuitry on a second board), the Multimoog was intended to be a less expensive alternative to the Minimoog. It nevertheless had some advanced features which the Minimoog did not—most notably, it was one of the earliest synthesizers to feature aftertouch capability.

Key features include:
 44-note monophonic keyboard with aftertouch
 ribbon-type pitch-bend controller
 "glide" (portamento)
 2 voltage-controlled oscillators with waveform continuously adjustable from sawtooth, through square, to narrow pulse
 oscillator sync
 noise source
 24 dB/octave Moog transistor-ladder lowpass voltage-controlled filter
 dedicated low-frequency oscillator with triangle, square, and random waveforms
 extensive modulation routing options, including sample-and-hold, audio-frequency modulation of the VCF for quasi-ring modulation, waveform sweep/quasi-pulse-width modulation, and more
 2 AR (attack/release) envelope generators with switchable percussive/sustaining profiles
 external audio input for processing instruments, vocals, etc.
 external control voltage and trigger inputs/outputs for interfacing with other synthesizer equipment

See also
 Micromoog
 Memorymoog
 Minimoog
 Moog modular synthesizer
 Moog synthesizer
 Robert Moog
 Moog Music
 List of Moog synthesizer players

Further reading

External links 
 Multimoog at Synthmuseum.com
 Multimoog at Vintage Synth Explorer
 Multimoog at Synthtopia

Analog synthesizers
Moog synthesizers
Monophonic synthesizers